The Zarnitsa mine ( Kimberlitovaya Almaznaya Trubka "Зарница"; English: kimberlite diamond pipe  "Lightning" (more exact translation: "heat lightning")) was the first kimberlite diamond pipe discovered in Russia. It is located in the Daldyn-Alakit kimberlite field, in the watershed of two small streams that flow into the Daldyn River.

In was discovered on August 21, 1954 by geologists Natalya Sarsadskikh (Наталья Сарсадских) and Larisa Popugayeva, however their priority was recognized only in 1970 for Popugayeva and in 1990 for Sarsadskikh. Initially the mine was underestimated, and the Mir mine was developed first. Zarnitsa was reevaluated in the early 1980s and recognized as developable. It has been working at full capacity since the early 2000s.

The Zarnitsa mine is one of the largest diamond mines in Russia and in the world. The mine is located in the north-eastern part of the country in the Sakha Republic. The mine has estimated reserves of 52 million carats of diamonds and an annual production capacity of 0.2 million carats.

References

Diamond mines in Russia
Diamond mines in the Soviet Union
Economy of Siberia
Science and technology in the Soviet Union
Surface mines in Russia
Diatremes of Russia